Evelyn Verrasztó (born 17 July 1989) is a Hungarian swimmer, who competed for her native country at the Summer Olympics in 2004, 2008, 2012 and 2016.

Her father and coach, Zoltán Verrasztó, and her brother, Dávid Verrasztó are also Olympic swimmers.

Early life
Evelyn was born in 1989, one year after her brother, Dávid Verrasztó in Budapest. Their father, an Olympic swimmer himself, coached them to become world-class swimmers.

Awards
  Cross of Merit of the Republic of Hungary – Bronze Cross (2008)
Hungarian swimmer of the Year (1): 2008

References

External links

1989 births
Living people
Swimmers from Budapest
Hungarian female backstroke swimmers
Hungarian female freestyle swimmers
Hungarian female medley swimmers
Olympic swimmers of Hungary
Swimmers at the 2004 Summer Olympics
Swimmers at the 2008 Summer Olympics
Swimmers at the 2012 Summer Olympics
Swimmers at the 2016 Summer Olympics
World record setters in swimming
European Aquatics Championships medalists in swimming
Swimmers at the 2020 Summer Olympics
21st-century Hungarian women
Competitors at the 2022 World Games
World Games gold medalists